James Franklin Baskett (February 16, 1904 – July 9, 1948) was an American actor who portrayed Uncle Remus, singing the song "Zip-a-Dee-Doo-Dah" in the 1946 Disney feature film Song of the South.

In recognition of his portrayal of Remus, he was given an Honorary Academy Award in 1948, making him the first Black male performer to receive an Oscar.

Career

Baskett studied pharmacology as a young man but gave it up to pursue an acting career. He first moved to New York City, New York, where he joined up with Bill 'Mr. Bojangles' Robinson. Using the name Jimmie Baskette, he appeared with Louis Armstrong on Broadway in the 1929 black musical revue Hot Chocolates and in several all-black New York films, including Harlem is Heaven (1932).

He later moved to Los Angeles, California, and had a supporting role in the film Straight to Heaven (1939), starring Nina Mae McKinney. In 1941 he voiced Fats Crow in the animated Disney film Dumbo, and he also had bit parts in several B movies, including that of Lazarus in Revenge of the Zombies (1943), a porter in The Heavenly Body (1944), and native tribal leader Orbon in Jungle Queen (1945). From 1944 until 1948, he was part of the cast of the Amos 'n' Andy Show live radio program as lawyer Gabby Gibson.

In 1945, he auditioned for a bit part voicing one of the animals in the new Disney feature film Song of the South (1946), based on the Uncle Remus stories by Joel Chandler Harris. Walt Disney was impressed with Baskett's talent and hired him on the spot for the lead role of Uncle Remus. Baskett was also given the voice role of Brer Fox, one of the film's animated antagonists, and also filled in as the main animated protagonist, Brer Rabbit, in one sequence.  This was one of the first Hollywood portrayals of a black actor as a non-comic character in a leading role in a film meant for general audiences.

Baskett was prohibited from attending the film's premiere in Atlanta, Georgia, because Atlanta was racially segregated by law.

Although Baskett was occasionally criticized for accepting such a "demeaning" role (most of his acting credits were that of African-American stereotypes), his acting was almost universally praised, and columnist Hedda Hopper, along with Walt Disney, was one of the many journalists and personalities who declared that he should receive an Academy Award for his work.

Academy Honorary Award
On March 20, 1948, Baskett received an Academy Honorary Award for his performance as Uncle Remus.

He was the first African-American male actor to win an Academy Award. Additionally, Baskett was the last adult actor to receive an Honorary Oscar for a single performance.

Illness and death
Baskett had been in poor health during the filming of Song of the South due to diabetes and he suffered a heart attack in December 1946 shortly after the film's release. His health continued to decline, and he was often unable to attend the Amos 'n' Andy radio show he was on, missing almost half of the 1947–1948 season. On July 9, 1948, during the show's summer hiatus, James Baskett died at his home of heart failure resulting from diabetes at age 44. He was survived by his wife Margaret and his mother Elizabeth. He is buried at Crown Hill Cemetery in Indianapolis.

Filmography

See also
 List of African-American firsts

References

External links
 
 
 

1904 births
1948 deaths
Male actors from Indianapolis
Academy Honorary Award recipients
African-American male actors
American male film actors
American male radio actors
American male stage actors
American male voice actors
Burials at Crown Hill Cemetery
20th-century American male actors
Vaudeville performers
20th-century African-American people